Roman Slobodjan (born January 1, 1975) is a German chess grandmaster since 1996, and an International master since 1993. Slobodjan won the 1995 World Junior Chess Championship (under 20).

He was twice the Under-20 German Champion- in 1992 in Augsburg, and in 1994 in Herborn.

In the July 2011 FIDE list, he has an Elo rating of 2534. His highest rating was 2575 (in July 1998).

References

External links

1975 births
Living people
Chess grandmasters
German chess players
World Junior Chess Champions